A bailar (Spanish "to dance") may refer to:

Music

Albums
A Bailar, album by Lali Espósito
A Bailar, album by Banghra

Songs
"A bailar", tango by Piazzolla feat. Francisco Fiorentino
"A bailar", tango by Aníbal Troilo Homero Expósito / Domingo Federico
"A bailar", song by Gloria Estefan feat. Papo Lucca from 90 Millas G.Estefan/Gaitán/E. Estefan 2007
A Bailar (Lali Espósito song)
"A bailar", song by Zacarías Ferreíra from El Triste (Zacarías Ferreíra album) 2004	
"A Bailar" by La Sonora Matancera composed by Bienvenido Granda from Algo Especial Por La Sonora Matancera 1994
"Al Bailar", song by Yuri (Mexican singer)
"A Bailar Merengue", song by Xavier Cugat And His Orchestra  1956

See also
Bailar (disambiguation)